Killyneary is a townland in the civil parish of Templeport, County Cavan, Ireland. It lies in the Roman Catholic parish of Templeport and barony of Tullyhaw.

Geography

Killyneary is bounded on the north by Brackley, Templeport townland, on the west by Derrymony townland, on the south by Erraran and Bawnboy townlands and on the east by Carrick East townland. Its chief geographical features are Brackley Lough, forestry plantations, streams, dug wells and a spring well. Killyneary is traversed by the national secondary N87 road (Ireland), minor roads and rural lanes. The townland covers 152 statute acres.

History

In medieval times the McGovern barony of Tullyhaw was divided into economic taxation areas called ballibetoes, from the Irish Baile Biataigh (Anglicized as 'Ballybetagh'), meaning 'A Provisioner's Town or Settlement'. The original purpose was to enable the farmer, who controlled the baile, to provide hospitality for those who needed it, such as poor people and travellers. The ballybetagh was further divided into townlands farmed by individual families who paid a tribute or tax to the head of the ballybetagh, who in turn paid a similar tribute to the clan chief. The steward of the ballybetagh would have been the secular equivalent of the erenagh in charge of church lands. There were seven ballibetoes in the parish of Templeport. Killyneary was located in the ballybetagh of "Balleagheboynagh" (alias 'Ballyoghnemoynagh'). The original Irish is Baile Na Muighe Eanach, meaning 'The Town of the Marshy Plain'). The ballybetagh was also called "Aghawenagh", the original Irish is Achadh an Bhuí Eanaigh, meaning 'The Field of the Yellow Bog').

The 1609 Ulster Plantation Baronial Map depicts the townland as Killinirie.

The 1615 & 1627 Plantation of Ulster grants spell it as Camera and Killyn-Irry, or Killiniry.

The 1652 Commonwealth Survey spells the name as Killeneary.

The 1665 Down Survey map depicts it as Carronary.

William Petty's 1685 map depicts it as Carronary.

In the grants of the early 1600s, Killyneary was split into two poles of land, one went to the Church of Ireland and one to the Graham family. On 25 January 1627 a grant was made of- one pole of Killyn-Irry, or Killiniry to Thomas Groves, the Rector or Vicar of the parish of Templepurt to hold as glebe land of Templeport Church. The said Thomas Groves was the Anglican rector of Templeport parish from 1626 to 1632.

In the Plantation of Ulster by grant dated 26 June 1615, King James VI and I granted, inter alia,- one poll in Camera to Sir George Graeme and Sir Richard Graeme to form part of the Manor of Greame.
An Inquisition held at Cavan on 31 October 1627 found that- George Greames was seised as of fee, of 20 polls of land in Co. Cavan, including 1 poll in Camera and he died 9 October 1624. William Greames, his son and heir, was then 30 years old (born 1594) and unmarried. An Inquisition held at Belturbet on 12 June 1661 found that- 

William Graham took part in the Irish Rebellion of 1641 as appears from the following deposition of William Reynolds of Lissanover-
folio 260r
 William Reynolds Jur 6o Apr 1643 Will: Aldrich Hen: Brereton John Sterne: Cavan William Reinolds Jur 6o Apr 1643 Intw Cert fact [Copy at MS 832, fols 59r-59v]

A history of Richard and George Graham is viewable online at-  

After the Cromwellian Act for the Settlement of Ireland 1652 the Graham lands in Killyneary were seised by the Government and were distributed as follows-

The 1652 Commonwealth Survey lists the proprietor being The Commonwealth of England and the tenant as being William Lawther who also appears as tenant of several other Templeport townlands in the same survey.

The 1662 Hearth Money Rolls show no Hearth Tax payers in Killyneary.

In the Templeport Poll Book of 1761 there were only two people registered to vote in Killyneary in the 1761 Irish general election - Henry Pratt and Richard Jackman. They were entitled to two votes. Both voted for Lord Newtownbutler (later Brinsley Butler, 2nd Earl of Lanesborough) who was elected Member of Parliament for Cavan County and for George Montgomery (MP) of Ballyconnell who lost the election. Absence from the poll book either meant a resident did not vote or more likely was not a freeholder entitled to vote, which would mean most of the inhabitants of Killyneary.

A lease dated 10 December 1774 from William Crookshank to John Enery of Bawnboy includes the lands of Killinery. A further deed by John Enery dated 13 December 1774 includes the lands of Killinery otherwise Killanery.

The 1790 Cavan Carvaghs list spells the name as Killenery.

The Tithe Applotment Books for 1827 list nine tithepayers in the townland.

The Killyneary Valuation Office Field books are available for November 1839.

Griffith's Valuation of 1857 lists seven landholders in the townland.

Census

In the 1901 census of Ireland, there are five families listed in the townland,
 and in the 1911 census of Ireland, there are only three families listed in the townland.

Antiquities

There do not seem to be any structures of historical interest in Killyneary.

References

External links
The IreAtlas Townland Data Base

Townlands of County Cavan